Albert Woyciechowski (April 3, 1868 – February 10, 1899) was a German–American railroad employee and politician.

Born in Lohrens, Germany, he moved to Milwaukee, Wisconsin in 1869. He worked in the railroad business. He served in the Wisconsin State Assembly in 1899 as a Democrat and died while still in office.

Notes

1868 births
1899 deaths
Politicians from Milwaukee
Democratic Party members of the Wisconsin State Assembly
19th-century American politicians
German emigrants to the United States